Jones M. Chamblee (born October 13, 1936) was an American politician in the state of South Carolina. He served in the South Carolina House of Representatives as a member of the Democratic Party from 1975 to 1976, representing Anderson County, South Carolina. He was a farmer and realtor.

References

1936 births
Living people
People from Anderson, South Carolina
Democratic Party members of the South Carolina House of Representatives